St. John's Hospital, or St. John's Medical Center, or similar, may refer to:

Belgium
Old St. John's Hospital, Bruges

China
St. John Hospital (Hong Kong)

India
St. John's Medical College, Bangalore

Ireland
St. John's Hospital, Limerick, County Limerick
St. John's Hospital (Sligo), County Sligo
St. John's Hospital (Enniscorthy), County Wexford

Israel
Saint John Eye Hospital Group, Jerusalem

Portugal
St John's Hospital (Hospital de São João), Porto

United Kingdom
St John's Hospital, Livingston, Scotland
St John's Hospital, Bracebridge Heath, Lincolnshire, England
St John's Hospital, Bath, Somerset, England
Hospital of St John and St Elizabeth, St John's Wood, London
St John's Hospital, Stone, Buckinghamshire, England
Hospital of St John Baptist without the Barrs, Lichfield, England

United States
Saint John's Health Center, Santa Monica, California
St. John's Hospital Camarillo, Camarillo, California
St. John's Regional Medical Center (California), Oxnard, California
St. John's Riverside Hospital, Yonkers, New York
St. John's Hospital (Springfield, Illinois)
Ascension St. John Hospital, Detroit, Michigan
St. John's Hospital (Maplewood, Minnesota)
St. John's Regional Medical Center (Missouri), Joplin, Missouri
University Hospitals St. John Medical Center, Westlake, Ohio
St. John Medical Center, Tulsa, Oklahoma
St. John's Health, Jackson, Wyoming

Defunct
St. John's Episcopal Hospital, Brooklyn, New York
St John's Queens (Elmhurst, Queens, NY), New York City. Closed in 2009